Radical Teacher is a socialist, feminist, and anti-racist peer-reviewed academic journal dedicated to the theory and practice of education. The journal examines the root causes of inequality and promotes progressive social change in the field of education. It serves the community of educators at all levels of education who are working for democratic process, peace and justice.

History and Profile
Radical Teacher was founded in 1975. It is published to the public three times per year by the University Library System at the University of Pittsburgh. Radical Teacher headquarters resides in Cambridge, Massachusetts. The academic journal publishes articles of interest to radical educators at all levels of education. It reports on pedagogy and curriculum, as well as on educational issues related to gender and sexuality, globalization, race, disability and similar topics. The journal attempts to examine the root causes of inequality and promotes the idea that educators should also be activists who work for progressive social change. In order to be published into the academic journal each article is rigorously reviewed by dozens of individuals with a background in education from across the United States.

Each issue of the magazine has a theme to which most of the articles relate. Themes that have been covered in the past include "Teaching in a Time of War", "Teaching Black Lives Matter", "Race in the Classroom", and "Beyond Identity Politics". In addition to articles, Radical Teacher also includes book reviews, teaching notes, and news for educational workers.

Subscription to this academic journal is free.

Blog
Radical Teacher has a blog that can be reached through their website. The blog follows the same topic format as the journal, but is updated in real-time. The blog allows individuals a real-time update on educational issues, in an electronic format. Blog posts are not repeated in the journal releases.

See also
 Critical pedagogy

References

Political magazines published in the United States
Anti-racism in the United States
Critical pedagogy
Education magazines
Feminism in the United States
Magazines established in 1975
Magazines published in Boston
Socialist feminism
Socialism in the United States
Socialist magazines
Triannual magazines published in the United States
Feminist magazines
1975 establishments in the United States